Excess Baggage was a BBC Radio 4 travel programme that ran for 173 episodes from 2010 to 2012. The programme had a magazine format, featuring travellers' tales, experiences and anecdotes. It was presented by John McCarthy and Sandi Toksvig. All episodes are available on BBC Sounds.

See also 
 List of travel podcasts

References 

BBC Radio 4 programmes
2010 radio programme debuts